Drayangs are entertainment bars in Bhutan. They typically serve alcoholic beverages, and have a stage on which entertainers dance to and sing songs solicited from or requested by members of the audience. The songs are usually traditional Bhutanese music or from Bollywood. The majority of entertainers are women. As of 2018, there were 49 drayangs in Bhutan, with 14 located in the capital Thimphu.

Drayang entertainers are usually paid a basic monthly salary, and are allowed to collect extra money from the audience for requested songs.

There is a range of opinions on drayangs in Bhutan. Critics view them as shady and exploitative of women. Drayang owners deny that they allow abuse, and state that drayangs generate employment for the entertainers, who would otherwise be unemployed because of lack of opportunity and education.

On January 7 the government decided to cease the operation of drayangs in the country through an executive order from the Prime Minister Lotay Tshering. There were 60 drayangs in the country that have been closed since the onset of the pandemic in March 2020. Most drayangs are operating as bars today

References 

Bars (establishments)
Bhutanese culture